is a Japanese pop rock duo formed in Tokyo in 1995, consisting of singers Ami Onuki and Yumi Yoshimura. In the United States, they adopted the name Puffy AmiYumi to avoid legal naming conflicts with Sean Combs, who also performed under the name Puffy. They sing in Japanese and English.

Onuki and Yoshimura were scouted by Sony-affiliated talent agencies and put together in the mid-1990s. Most of their work was produced or co-written by Tamio Okuda and Andy Sturmer, formerly of the bands Unicorn and Jellyfish, respectively.

The pair's first release "Asia no Junshin" (1996) sold a million records. They gained mainstream success in Japan during 1998, following the release of their album Jet CD and continued with several more full-length releases (totaling 15 million sales in Japan).

In 2004, an animated series featuring cartoon versions of Onuki and Yoshimura, Hi Hi Puffy AmiYumi, premiered on the US Cartoon Network. Although their characters were voiced by actresses, the singers portrayed themselves for short live-action segments taped in Japan.

History

Early recordings
When she was in high school, Ami sang for a band called "Hanoi Sex".  In her sophomore year, the band auditioned during the Sony SD Audition and passed, becoming employees of Sony Music Entertainment.  Years went by with little action by either the band or the record label, as Ami took vocal lessons and attended a professional school to learn how to become a better performer.  Eventually the band dissolved, leaving only Ami under Sony's employment.  She was encouraged to stay, despite lacking a band and a clear musical direction.

Separately, Yumi had learned of the Chotto Sokomade talent search underway by Sony Music Artists when she was "around 18".  She also auditioned and passed.  She moved on her own from Osaka to Tokyo, where she eventually met Ami by chance in the Sony Music offices and then at a concert after-party, when the two hit it off.  Both felt alone within the large Sony organization and neither were confident in their abilities as solo artists, so even though Ami had already recorded a solo CD under the guidance of former Unicorn front-man Tamio Okuda (it would later become half of solosolo), they requested Sony pair them as a duo.

As Puffy
Producer and American pop musician Andy Sturmer christened them "Puffy", and is considered by Ami and Yumi as "the godfather of Puffy". Ami had previously met Tamio Okuda at a Sparks Gogo concert, and he had produced her then-unreleased solo CD. He was eventually signed on to produce Puffy's first album AmiYumi.  Their debut single, "Asia no Junshin", launched Puffy-mania. Asked if they were surprised by the attention after its success, Yumi told an interviewer "... everything that was put together for that song all came together and made it happen, but we didn't expect it. It was luck."

As "Puffy-mania" exploded, they became multimedia stars, including hosting their own weekly TV show Pa-Pa-Pa-Pa-Puffy with guests such as Lenny Kravitz, Sylvester Stallone, Harrison Ford, and rock band Garbage.

Puffy in the United States

Puffy made their first US appearance as part of Music Japan's "An Evening with Japan's All-Stars" showcase at the 2000 South by Southwest (SXSW) festival in Austin, Texas. After their performance at SXSW, attorneys for Sean "Puffy" Combs sent the band a cease and desist letter asking them to change their name. After changing their name in the US to Puffy AmiYumi, they told Entertainment Weekly:

After Pa-Pa-Pa-Pa-Puffy ended production in 2002, Puffy focused on performing in the United States. Several of their previous Japanese albums were released for the US market and they recorded theme songs for the animated series Teen Titans and SD Gundam Force. They have also done a cover version with Cyndi Lauper of her hit "Girls Just Wanna Have Fun". They were also interviewed on Jimmy Kimmel Live! by Jimmy Kimmel and performed their songs "Hi Hi" and "Akai Buranko" (Red Swing) on the show. They came back to the US in 2006 for their Splurge Tour, and also toured with Tally Hall for Super-Ultimate Awesome Exploration America 2006 In January 2017, they announced for the US tour titled Puffy AmiYumi US TOUR 2017: NOT LAZY in April 2017. In the same month, the band made an appearance at Anime Boston for autograph signings. After their appearance at Boston Anime Convention they undertook a three city USA Tour which they called their 'Not Lazy Tour' of the cities of San Francisco, Los Angeles, and Dallas, Texas.

Animated series
On November 19, 2004, an animated series featuring cartoon versions of Ami and Yumi, Hi Hi Puffy AmiYumi, premiered on the United States' Cartoon Network. Despite both of them being voiced by American actresses (though Janice Kawaye, who plays Ami, is of Japanese descent), the real Ami and Yumi star in short live-action segments taped in Japan. The show also featured some of Puffy's music. Cartoon Network's Japan service started airing episodes of the series (in English with Japanese subtitles) in 2005. In October of that year, TV Tokyo began airing a Japanese-dubbed version of the series, which eventually also went to CN Japan on January 8, 2006. Hi Hi Puffy AmiYumi also debuted in other countries such as Mexico, dubbed in Spanish, and Brazil, dubbed in Brazilian Portuguese, both transmitted on Cartoon Network.

Yumi said in an interview with LiveDaily:

Puffy AmiYumi made an appearance and performed in the Macy's Thanksgiving Day Parade in 2005 where they were also represented by their own Hi Hi Puffy AmiYumi float and balloon.

On January 16, 2006 Ami and Yumi were appointed goodwill ambassadors to the United States as part of the Japanese government's campaign to encourage tourism in Japan. They kicked off their 10th anniversary tour in Japan on April 14, 2006, then toured the East Coast of the United States with the PuffyAmiYumi Tour '06 Splurge! Splurge! Splurge! from July 8 to July 19, 2006, coinciding with the premiere of their new television show, Hi Hi PUFFY Bu.

Ami and Yumi also performed cameo voice overs in an episode of the 2011 anime series, Usagi Drop, which aired on July 8, 2011. They also performed the opening theme to the anime.

Musical style
Their music has been largely a collaboration between producer Tamio Okuda, American singer-songwriter Andy Sturmer, and Ami and Yumi themselves. Ami and Yumi's vocals have been likened to U.S. vocal sister group The Roches. They often sing whole songs together with harmonies and their sound borrows heavily from The Beatles and other artists such as ABBA, The Who, and The Carpenters. Both Ami and Yumi themselves have openly admitted that their music is hard to put into just one genre because of the many different influences.

Influences
They have mentioned Okuda, The Blue Hearts, Boom Boom Satellites, and Blankey Jet City as their main influences, and named their album Jet CD after Blankey Jet City.

Backing band members
Fumio Yanagisawa - lead guitar, backing vocals
Takeshi Tsuji - keyboards, backing vocals
Hiroharu Kinoshita - bass, backing vocals
Takashi Furuta - drums, percussion
Junichi Fujimoto - rhythm guitar

Discography

 AmiYumi (1996)
 SoloSolo (1997)
 Jet CD (1998)
 Fever Fever (1999)
 Spike (2000)
 The Hit Parade (2002)
 Nice. (2003)
 59 (2004)
 Splurge (2006)
 Honeycreeper (2007)
 Puffy AmiYumi x Puffy (2009)
 Bring It! (2009)
 Thank You (2011)
The Puffy (2021)

Television work
1997–2000: Saku Saku Morning Call1997–2002: Pa-Pa-Pa-Pa-Puffy2003–2006: Teen Titans theme
2004–2006: Hi Hi Puffy AmiYumi2006: Hi Hi PUFFY Bu2009: Dareka Ga for Naruto Shippuden the Movie: The Will of Fire 
2011: Usagi Drop (Episode 9 voiceover)
2013–present: Teen Titans Go!'' theme

References

External links
 Official Japanese site
 Official English site
 
 J!-ENT Puffy AmiYumi interviews from 2000-2007

 
All-female punk bands
Japanese girl groups
Japanese pop punk groups
Japanese pop rock music groups
Mandarin-language singers of Japan
Musical groups established in 1995
Musical groups from Tokyo
Ki/oon Music artists
Sony Music Entertainment Japan artists
Sony BMG artists
Columbia Records artists
Epic Records artists
Warner Music Japan artists
Atlantic Records artists
1995 establishments in Japan
Japanese musical duos
Rock music duos
Female musical duos